By Any Means Necessary is the seventh studio album by American rapper Pastor Troy. It was released on March 23, 2004 through Universal Records, making it the artist's third and final record for the label. Production was handled by DJ Toomp, Michael "Kook" Mason, Oomp Camp, Cooly C, Da Masta, Khalifani, Limesha Wright and Taj Mahal, with Al Troy, Pastor Troy and Robert "Georgia Boy" Watson serving as executive producers. It features guest appearances from 8Ball, Chip, DJ Mars, Juvenile, Lil Pete, Lil' Will and Ms. Shyneka. The album peaked at number 30 on the Billboard 200 and at number 7 on the Top R&B/Hip-Hop Albums in the United States.

Track listing

Charts

References

External links

2004 albums
Pastor Troy albums
Universal Records albums
Albums produced by DJ Toomp